Lost Property Office is a 2017 stop-motion animated short film written and directed by Daniel Agdag and produced by Liz Kearney. The film about a lost property office in a train station premiered at the 56th Melbourne International Film Festival.

Awards

References

External links
 

Australian animated short films
2017 short films
2010s stop-motion animated films
2010s Australian animated films
Lost and found